The Michigan Southern Railroad (doing business as Napoleon, Defiance & Western Railroad (NDW), formerly Maumee & Western reporting - MAW) is a freight railroad in the United States operating between Woodburn, Indiana and Napoleon, Ohio and comprises 58 miles of track. The railroad originally extended to Toledo; portions have been converted to a rail trail.

There is currently railcar storage in Napoleon, Ohio. The line is used Monday through Saturday between Defiance and Napoleon, upon request in Woodburn, and between Woodburn to Defiance where the railroad's main yard is. The track, which runs over the swamp ground for much of its length, is in an extremely poor state of repair, having had no maintenance since the early 1970s.

The railroad was purchased by Pioneer Railcorp on December 28, 2012, which announced the intention to repair and extend it. Pioneer described the line as "in dire need of rehabilitation," and it began extensive rehabilitation in January 2013, replacing decayed cross ties and broken rail. In 2020, Pioneer received a $4.1 million grant under the U.S. Department of Transportation's Consolidated Rail Infrastructure and Safety Improvements (CRISI) program for further repairs. The grant covered approximately 50% of the cost of replacing steel rail on 10 miles of ND&W line and replacing ties on 28 miles of line.

There are two interchanges:
Norfolk Southern Railway in Woodburn;
CSX in Defiance.

Current locomotive fleet 

Pioneer also operates trackage in Cecil, Ohio that leads to Lafarge North America (Paulding Plant).

The railroad was originally a main line on the Wabash Railroad 5th District from New Haven, Indiana, to Toledo, Ohio, and was latterly part of the bankrupt Indiana Hi-Rail Corporation. The line between Defiance, Ohio, and Woodburn, was acquired with funding from the Ohio Rail Development Commission (ORDC).

References

External links

Indiana railroads
Ohio railroads
Pioneer Lines
Switching and terminal railroads